楠 may refer to:

 Kusunoki (disambiguation)
 Kusu (disambiguation)

See also
Japanese destroyer Kusunoki